Gian Francesco Biandrate di San Giorgio Aldobrandini (1545–1605) was a Roman Catholic cardinal.

Biography
On 3 Nov 1585, he was consecrated bishop by Giovanni Antonio Serbelloni, Cardinal-Bishop of Frascati, with Gaspare Cenci, Bishop of Melfi e Rapolla, and Filippo Sega, Bishop of Piacenza, serving as co-consecrators.

Episcopal succession
While bishop, he was the principal consecrator of Giovanni Anselmo Carminati, Bishop of Alba (1596) and Camillo Beccio, Bishop of Acqui (1599); and the principal co-consecrator of Ottavio Bandini, Archbishop of Fermo (1595).

References

External links and additional sources
 (for Chronology of Bishops) 
 (for Chronology of Bishops)  

1545 births
1605 deaths
17th-century Italian cardinals
16th-century Italian cardinals
16th-century Italian Roman Catholic bishops